Hamad Al-Ahbabi (Arabic:حمد الأحبابي) (born 4 January 1991) is an Emirati footballer who plays as a striker.

External links

References

Emirati footballers
1991 births
Living people
Al Ain FC players
Al Dhafra FC players
Baniyas Club players
UAE First Division League players
UAE Pro League players
Association football forwards